The John Moores Prize Exhibition is a bi-annual competitive art exhibition held at the Walker Art Gallery, Liverpool. It is named after Sir John Moores (1896–1993), the founder of the competition and one-time head of the Littlewoods clothes retailing empire.

First held in 1957, it is Britain's most well-known competition for aimed solely at painters and is now part of the Liverpool Biennial, a citywide celebration of the arts that encompasses the Tate Liverpool, Bluecoats Gallery and other venues in Liverpool.

In 2008, the exhibition was a major part of Liverpool's celebrations as European Capital of Culture.

References

Culture in Liverpool